"Panic Station" is a song by English rock band Muse, released as the fifth single from their sixth studio album The 2nd Law on 31 May 2013. The song was written by Matthew Bellamy. It is featured as the third track on the album.

Music video
The music video for "Panic Station" was filmed in January 2013 in Japan, during when the band was appearing in the country's The 2nd Law World Tour. It was released on 22 April 2013. The video is set in Tokyo.

The original video featured the Rising Sun Flag in the intro. This drew the ire of many East Asian listeners, who felt that the flag represented Japanese militarism from World War II. The controversy led the band to apologise through Twitter and re-upload a new version of the video, which replaced the Rising Sun Flag with the Japanese flag.

Reception
Most reviewers compared "Panic Station" to other songs. In a review of the album, the BBC's Ian Winwood wrote that the song "borrows from both Queen's "Another One Bites the Dust" and Michael Jackson's "Thriller", without ever attaining the majesty of either tune." The A.V. Club called it the album's "catchiest song" and thought "it’s not hard to imagine Bellamy strutting around the stage like Michael Hutchence, oozing sex with his stunning falsetto backing metal-pop riffs." The reviewer, however, concluded that it "would be a real triumph if it didn’t sound so much like another band." Helen Brown of The Daily Telegraph opined that the single had a "disco feel," with "nods at INXS's "Suicide Blonde", Queen’s "Another One Bites the Dust", David Bowie's "Fame" and Prince's "Kiss" – ends up sounding a bit like a Scissor Sisters number." Billboard noted that the song is "aggressive until it serves up a 70s-sounding falsetto chorus with audacious horns. It's all incredibly self-indulgent in an impressively restrained amount of time, with every Muse hallmark included and every riff a champion."

At the 56th Annual Grammy Awards, the song received a nomination for Best Rock Song.

Track listing

Charts

Weekly charts

Year-end charts

Release history

References

Songs written by Matt Bellamy
Muse (band) songs
2013 singles
2012 songs
Warner Records singles
Funk rock songs